Cristina Zenato is an Italian-born shark diver and conservationist. She is known for her work with Caribbean reef sharks in The Bahamas.

Early life 
Zenato was born in Italy in 1971. Her father was a special forces military diver. She was raised in the Congo until she was 15. She completed high school in Italy.

Career 
Zenato began training as a dive instructor and working with sharks in 1995. The same year, she began working for Underwater Explorer's Society (UNEXSO). Later, she became both a PADI Course Director and NSS-CDS Cave Diving Instructor with UNEXSO. Zenato's cave diving projects have included remapping the underwater caves in the Lucayan National Park. Zenato was inducted into the Women Divers Hall of Fame in 2011. She is known for promoting the conservation of, diving with, removing fish hooks from Caribbean reef sharks around Grand Bahama Island. Her work has garnered her the titles of "shark whisperer".

Zenato has been featured in numerous films and television programs including Shark Week's Sharktacular, Against the Current, and Save This Shark. In the late 2010s, she founded the non-profit, People of the Water.

Personal life 
Zenato first went to the Bahamas in 1994, during which time she decided she wanted to move there permanently.

References 

1971 births
Living people
Cave diving explorers

Professional divers
Italian underwater divers
Shark conservation